Amu Kandi (also Romanized as ‘Amū Kandī) is a village in Zarrineh Rud Rural District, Bizineh Rud District, Khodabandeh County, Zanjan Province, Iran. At the 2006 census, its population was 268, in 51 families.

References 

Populated places in Khodabandeh County